María Susana Giménez Aubert (born 29 January 1944), known as Susana Giménez, is an Argentine TV host, actress, model and businesswoman. In 2012, she was considered the biggest celebrity in Argentine television by the media firm that publishes her eponymous magazine.

She was the host of Susana Giménez, a highly rated television variety show in Argentina, similar in format to those of Raffaella Carrà (in Italy and Spain) and Oprah Winfrey (in United States). In 1997, she was awarded with the Golden Martín Fierro Award, and in 2002 won the INTE award for TV hostess of the Year.

Early life

Giménez was the daughter of María Luisa Sanders, of Irish descent, and Augusto Giménez Aubert, of Spanish descent. She had a hard childhood, tainted by her parents' separation. She studied in Quilmes, and graduated from La Anunciata Collegiate as a primary school teacher, a profession she never practised. Before becoming famous, for a couple of years Giménez worked as an executive secretary for a large factory.

Career
At 19 years old, she became a model, and made her name in a TV commercial for Cadum, a brand of French soap. Most of her subsequent film career was in adult-oriented comedies, acting opposite Alberto Olmedo, Jorge Porcel, and fellow vedette Moria Casán. Giménez has acted in over 30 films, including the cult film La Mary, and 10 plays. In 2008, Giménez launched her own magazine called Susana, published by La Nación. She is featured in the cover of every issue. She had her own fashion doll, and has endorsed two fragrances.

Personal life
In 1962, aged 17, she married businessman Mario Sarabayrouse. A year later she gave birth to her only daughter, Mercedes Sarabayrouse Giménez.

In 1970 she starred in 'La Mary', a film directed by Daniel Tinayre, where she met Carlos Monzón, a notorious Argentine boxer with whom she started a relationship that lasted two years. For 9 years she was in a relationship with actor Ricardo Darín, who was thirteen years younger. They ended up on good terms, remaining great friends. Susana would invite the actor as the first guest every year on her show.

In 1988 she married Huberto Roviralta, a polo player, whom she divorced in 1998. She had to pay ten million dollars to Roviralta as a divorce settlement.

From her daughter Mercedes, Giménez has two grandchildren, Lucía and Manuel. In private her family and friends call her "Su", a practice that has been adopted by her fans.

Filmography

Awards

Martín Fierro Awards
 Martín Fierro Best New Actress for Marriageand more (1969)
 Martín Fierro for best entertainment programwithHola Susana (1994)
 Martín Fierro de Oro (1995)
 Martín Fierro Best Female talk show host (1995)
 Martín Fierro Best Female talk show host (1998)
 Martín Fierro Best Female talk show host (1999)
 Martín Fierro Best Female talk show host (2000)
 Martín Fierro Best Female talk show host (2001)
 Martín Fierro for best entertainment program for Susana Gimenez (2004)
 Martín Fierro Best Female Host (2005)
 Martín Fierro Recognition (2006)
 Martín Fierro for best entertainment program for Susana Gimenez (2007)
 Martín Fierro for best entertainment program for Susana Gimenez (2008)
 Martín Fierro of Platin (2009)
 Martín Fierro of Platin for Hola Susana (2010)
 Martín Fierro for best entertainment program for Susana Gimenez (2011)
 Martín Fierro Best Female talk show host (2012)
 Martín Fierro for the trajectory of 25 years of her program (2012)

Other awards 
  Sea Star  with  Woman of the Year (1983)
  Carlos '86  with  Woman of the Year (1986)
  Konex to musical actress of the decade (1991)
  Prensario (1991)
  Broadcasting (1993)
  Distinction Argentores (1995)
  Prensario (1993)
  Prensario (1995)
  Golden Cap (1995) Gente Magazine (star that tops took over, 128 times)
  Broadcasting (1996)
  Paoli best comprehensive program (2000)
  Paoli to the most popular figure (2000)
  Llave de Puerto Rico (2001)
  Paoli to the international career (2002)
  INTE TV HISPANIC TV the cheerleader of the year (2002)
  Clarín, the best TV host (2004)
  Profile to the best production with current celebrity (2005)
  Cover Caras (2005) (210 times)
  FUNDTV the best entertainment: Susana Giménez: The Unbeatable (2005)
  People of Peru to the prime abroad program (2005)
  Llave de Punta del Este (2004)
  Bal Habour Key (2004)
  Latin Grammy presidency, awarded to the successful Argentina conductive for his help to promote and spread the music of Latino artists (2008)
  Pléyade Magazine Award for "Susana" (2008) 
  Award "Referrer" by the "International Foundation Young Leaders" (2009)
  Godmother of the National Festival of the Sun (2009–2010)
  Godmother of the Favaloro Foundation (2009)
  Career Silver Condor award (2014)

Notes

References

External links 

 
 

1944 births
Living people
Actresses from Buenos Aires
Golden Martín Fierro Award winners
Argentine people of Irish descent
Argentine people of Spanish descent
Argentine film actresses
Argentine television presenters
Argentine women television presenters
Argentine television talk show hosts
Argentine vedettes
Argentine musical theatre actresses
Argentine musical theatre female dancers
Argentine musical theatre women singers